David Bradbury may refer to:

 David Bradbury (film maker), Australian film maker
 David Bradbury (rugby league) (born 1972), Irish rugby league player
 David Bradbury (politician) (born 1976), Australian politician

See also
 David Bradberry (1736–1803), also spelt Bradbury, English nonconformist minister